This is a list of firsts in aviation. For a comprehensive list of women's records, see Women in aviation.

First person to fly
The first flight (including gliding) by a person is unknown. Several have been suggested.

 In 559 A.D., several prisoners of Emperor Wenxuan of Northern Qi, including Yuan Huangtou of Ye, were said to have been forced to launch themselves with a kite from a tower, as an experiment. Only Yuan Huangtou survived, only to be executed later.

 In the 9th century, the Andalusian Abbas ibn Firnas attempted a short gliding flight with wings covered with feathers from the Tower of Cordoba but was injured while landing.

 In the early 11th century, Eilmer of Malmesbury, an English Benedictine monk, attempted a gliding flight using wings. He is recorded as travelling a modest distance before breaking his legs on landing.

 Between 1630 and 1632, Hezarfen Ahmed Çelebi is said to have glided over the Bosphorus strait from the Galata Tower to the Üsküdar district in Istanbul.

 In 1633 his brother Lagari Hasan Çelebi may have survived a flight on a 7-winged rocket powered by gunpowder from Sarayburnu, the point below Topkapı Palace in Istanbul.

None of these historical accounts are adequately supported by corroborating evidence nor have any been widely accepted. The first confirmed human flight was accomplished by Jean-François Pilâtre de Rozier in a tethered Montgolfier balloon in 1783.

Lighter than air (aerostats)
First animals to fly in a balloon: a sheep called Montauciel, along with a duck and a rooster were sent on a balloon flight by the Montgolfier brothers on September 19, 1783 

First manned flight Étienne Montgolfier went aloft in a tethered Montgolfier hot air balloon on October 15, 1783.

First manned free flight in an untethered balloon Jean-François Pilâtre de Rozier and Marquis d'Arlandes flew in a Montgolfier hot air balloon from the Château de la Muette to the Butte-aux-Cailles, Paris, on November 21, 1783.

First manned gas balloon flight: Professor Jacques Charles and Nicolas-Louis Robert flew from Paris to Nesles-la-Vallée in a hydrogen-filled balloon on December 1, 1783.

First women to fly: The Marchioness and Countess of Montalembert, the Countess of Podenas and Miss de Lagarde ascended in a tethered balloon over Paris, on May 20, 1784.

First woman in free flight in an untethered balloon: Élisabeth Thible flew over Lyon singing arias on June 4, 1784, in order to entertain Gustav III of Sweden.

First flight in a steerable balloon (or airship): On July 15, 1784, the Robert brothers (Les Frères Robert) flew for 45 minutes from Saint-Cloud to Meudon with M. Collin-Hullin and Louis Philippe II, the Duke of Chartres, in an elongated balloon designed by Jacques Charles, following Jean Baptiste Meusnier's suggestions (1783–85), but the oars did not work.

First flight across the English Channel: was made by Jean-Pierre Blanchard and John Jeffries in a balloon on January 7, 1785.

First aviation disaster: Occurred in Tullamore, County Offaly, Ireland, when a hot air balloon caused a fire that burned down about 100 houses on May 10, 1785.

First known fatalities in an air crash: Jean-François Pilâtre de Rozier and Pierre Romain died when their Rozière balloon deflated and crashed near Wimereux in Pas-de-Calais, on June 15, 1785.

First jump from a balloon with a parachute: Jean-Pierre Blanchard used a parachute in 1793 to escape his hot air balloon when it ruptured.

First successful jump from a balloon with a parachute: Andre Jacques Garnerin in Paris in 1797.

First balloon ascent on horseback. Pierre Testu-Brissy ascended from Belleville Park in Paris.

First woman to pilot her own balloon: Sophie Blanchard flew solo from the garden of the Cloister of the Jacobins in Toulouse on August 18, 1805.

First woman to be killed in an aviation accident: Sophie Blanchard was killed when her hydrogen balloon ignited on July 6, 1819.

First successful steerable powered balloon: The Giffard dirigible was developed and flown by Henri Giffard, from the Paris Hippodrome to Trappes on September 24, 1852.

First balloon mail service: passed vital information over Prussian lines during the 1870–71 Siege of Paris.

First flight in an airship powered by an internal combustion engine: was made by Alberto Santos Dumont in 1898.

First flight of a rigid airship: was made by the Zeppelin LZ 1 from Lake Constance (the Bodensee) on July 2, 1900.

First woman to pilot a powered aircraft: Rose Isabel Spencer, in Stanley Spencer's Airship Number 1, at Crystal Palace, London on July 14, 1902.

First trans-Atlantic rigid airship flight: was made by the R34 from RAF East Fortune to Mineola, New York from July 2 to July 6, 1919.<ref name=transatlanticairship2>The Transatlantic Voyage of R.34 [[Flight International|Flight]] 10 July 1919, pp. 906–10</ref>

First helium-filled rigid airship to fly: was the USS Shenandoah on August 20, 1923, although it did not make a powered flight until September 24, 1923.

First crossing of the Atlantic by balloon: was made by Ben Abruzzo, Maxie Anderson, and Larry Newman in the helium-filled Double Eagle II, on August 17, 1978.

First non-stop balloon crossing of North America: Maxie and Kris Anderson in the helium-filled Kitty Hawk, on May 12, 1980.

First trans-Pacific crossing by balloon: Ben Abruzzo, Larry Newman, Ron Clark and Rocky Aoki, in gas-filled Double Eagle V, in November 1981.

 First balloon flight on another planet: was conducted by the Soviet Vega 1 Balloon in the skies above Venus between June 11, 1985 and June 13, 1985.

First non-stop balloon circumnavigation of the Earth: was made by Bertrand Piccard and Brian Jones who flew from Château d'Oex, Switzerland, to Egypt, on Breitling Orbiter 3, between March 1 and March 21, 1999, in 19 days, 21 hours and 47 minutes.

First solo non-stop balloon flight around the Earth: Steve Fossett, in the Spirit of Freedom, circumnavigated the globe between June 19 and July 3, 2002.

Heavier than air (aerodynes)
Pioneer era 1853–1916

First manned glider flight: was made by an unnamed boy in an uncontrolled glider launched by George Cayley in 1853.

First confirmed manned powered flight: was made by Clément Ader in an uncontrolled monoplane of his own design, in 1890.

First controlled manned glider flight: was made by Otto Lilienthal in a glider of his own design, in 1891.

First controlled, sustained flight in a powered airplane: was made by Orville Wright in the Wright Flyer on December 17, 1903, during which they travelled .

First circular flight by a powered airplane: was made by Wilbur Wright who flew  in about a minute and a half on September 20, 1904.

First aircraft to fly using ailerons for lateral control: was Robert Esnault-Pelterie's October 1904 glider, although ailerons were only named that in 1908 by Henry Farman.

First airplane passenger: was Léon Delagrange, with pilot Henri Farman, on March 29, 1908.

First use of the modern aircraft flight control system: was in the Blériot VIII, which took to the air with Robert Esnault-Pelterie's control layout, using a joystick for pitch and roll control, and a foot-bar for lateral control, in April 1908. 

First person to die in a crash of a powered airplane: was Thomas Etholen Selfridge, a passenger on an aircraft flown by Orville Wright which crashed on September 17, 1908. Wright was badly injured, and was hospitalised for seven weeks.

First official pilot's licence: was licence number 1, which was issued to Louis Blériot by the Aéro Club de France on January 7, 1909.

First aircraft to fly with a rotary engine: was a Farman III biplane, in April 1909.

First ditching of an airplane: was made by Hubert Latham, while attempting to complete the first powered flight across the English Channel in an Antoinette IV monoplane, but experienced an engine failure on July 19, 1909.

First airplane flight across the English Channel: was completed by Louis Blériot in a Blériot XI on July 25, 1909, to win a £1,000 Daily Mail prize.

First pig to fly on an airplane (or any animal): happened when John Moore-Brabazon, in the Short Biplane No. 2 (not a Voisin as sometimes reported) took a pig later named Icarus II aloft on November 4, 1909, as a joke to prove the adage that pigs could fly.

First flight in complete darkness: Henry Farman, flies a Farman biplane without the benefit of moonlight, on March 1, 1910.

First woman to earn a pilot license: was Raymonde de Laroche, on March 8, 1910.

First flight in Asia: was made by Giacomo D'Angelis, in a biplane built by D'Angelis entirely from his own designs, experimenting with a small horse-power engine, on March 29, 1910 in Chennai, India (formerly known as Madras).

First documented and witnessed seaplane flight under power from water's surface: was made by Henri Fabre, in the Fabre Hydravion Le Canard (the duck), on March 28, 1910.

First aircraft flight simulator: was built by aircraft manufacturer Antoinette to teach pupils to fly their monoplanes on May 7, 1910.

First Chief of State to fly on an airplane: was Ferdinand I of Bulgaria, as a passenger in a Farman III biplane flown by Jules de Laminne during a visit in Belgium on July 15, 1910.

First airborne radio communications: were made by Frederick Walker Baldwin and Douglas McCurdy with a morse radio message from a Curtiss biplane while in flight, which was received by a nearby ground station on August 27, 1910. They were also responsible for the first radio message received by an aircraft in flight, on March 6, 1911.

First mid-air collision between two airplanes: happened when an Antoinette IV, flown by René Thomas, rammed Bertram Dickson's Farman III biplane on October 1, 1910.

First shipboard take-off and landing by an airplane: was made by Eugene Burton Ely, in a Curtiss Model D pusher, from a temporary platform aboard light cruiser USS Birmingham on November 14, 1910. Ely was also the first to land an airplane on a ship, touching down on a temporary platform aboard armored cruiser USS Pennsylvania on January 11, 1911.

The first non-stop flight from London to Paris: Pierre Prier flew a Blériot XI on April 12, 1911 from London to Paris in 3 hours and 56 minutes.

First woman to die in a crash of a powered airplane: was Denise Moore, who fell from a Farman III, on July 21, 1911.

 First known spin recovery: was made by F. P. Raynham in an Avro Type D biplane on September 21, 1911.

First ordnance dropped from an airplane: Lieutenant Giulio Gavotti dropped grenades from his Etrich Taube airplane on Ottoman troops in Libya on November 1, 1911.

First transcontinental flight across North America: Calbraith Perry Rodgers flew the Vin Fiz Wright Model EX biplane through a seventy-plus-stop trek across the United States from Sheepshead Bay, New York to Long Beach, California from September 17 to December 10, 1911. 

First parachute jump from an airplane: was made by Grant Morton from a Wright Model B over Venice, California, in 1911. However credit is generally given to Albert Berry, who jumped from a Benoist biplane over Jefferson Barracks, Missouri, on March 1, 1912.

First night mission: was made by Lieutenant Giulio Gavotti during the campaign against the Ottoman Empire on March 4, 1912.

First woman to fly across the English Channel:was Harriet Quimby, who flew from Dover to Hardelot-Plage on April 16, 1912.

First airplane flight across the Irish Sea: was made by Denys Corbett Wilson took 100 minutes to fly a Blériot XI from Goodwick in Wales to Enniscorthy in Ireland, on April 22, 1912.

First take-off by an airplane from a moving ship: Commander Charles R. Samson took off from a platform aboard the battleship HMS Hibernia in a Short Improved S.27 No. 38, on May 9, 1912.

First flight of an all-metal aircraft: The Reissner Canard, designed by Professor Hans Reissner (with engineering help from Hugo Junkers), whose structure and skin were both all metal, was first flown on May 23, 1912 by Robert Gsell.

Proportions and diameter would later be adjusted. Both Germany and the UK issued orders for national markings only when they mobilized in 1914, for the First World War.

 First observed spin recovery: was made by Wilfred Parke in an Avro Type G on August 25, 1912.

First aircraft to be captured: was that of Captain Moizo of the Italian Servizio Aeronautico, on September 10, 1912 during the Italo-Turkish War, but sources disagree on whether he was shot down, or had mechanical problems.

First use of a flight data recorder: Invented by George M. Dyott and used in the 1913 Dyott monoplane. It used three pointers to record movements of the control surfaces on a strip of paper run between two rollers.

First four-engine aircraft to fly: The Russian Russo-Baltic Wagon Works Большой Балтийский (Bolshoi Baltiskiy – Great Baltic), developed by Igor Sikorsky; took to the air on May 10, 1913 after having two additional engines installed in pusher configuration, in tandem behind the pair of installed engines; when the original pair were found to leave it underpowered.

First bombing attack against a surface ship: Didier Masson and Captain Joaquín Bauche Alcalde dropped dynamite bombs on Federalist gunboats at Guaymas, Mexico, on May 10, 1913 while flying for Mexican Revolutionist Venustiano Carranza.

First propaganda leaflet flight: Didier Masson distributed propaganda leaflets from the air for the Mexican Revolutionist Venustiano Carranza, post May 10, 1913.

First loop: Pyotr Nesterov looped a Nieuport IV, on September 9, 1913.

First flight across the Mediterranean: Roland Garros flew a Morane-Saulnier G from the South of France to Tunisia, on September 23, 1913.

First aircraft to exceed  in level flight: Maurice Prévost flew a Deperdussin Monocoque in the 1913 Gordon Bennett Trophy race averaging over  during a lap on September 28, 1913.

First dogfight: Dean Ivan Lamb flying a Curtiss pusher and Phil Rader in a Christofferson biplane traded pistol shots while airborne, during the Siege of Naco, Mexico in November or December 1913.

First scheduled commercial airplane flight:Tony Jannus flew a Benoist XIV biplane flying-boat of the St. Petersburg-Tampa Airboat Line from St. Petersburg to Tampa in 23 minutes on January 1, 1914 with a paying passenger. This service ran until May 5, 1914.

First piloted flight indoors: Lincoln Beachey flew inside the Palace of Machinery intended for the Panama-Pacific International Exposition, in San Francisco, California on either February 16 or 17, 1914.

First aircraft downed by ground fire: On August 20, 1914 during the Battle of Cer, an Austro-Hungarian Lohner B.I of Fliegerkompagnie 13 was damaged by Royal Serbian Army small arms fire near Lešnica. The pilot escaped and the Serbs failed to repair his aircraft.

First aircraft intentionally downed by another aircraft: Pyotr Nesterov rammed an Austrian Albatros B.II of FLIK 11 with his Morane-Saulnier G on September 7, 1914 following previous attempts using a grappling hook. Both aircraft were destroyed and all were killed.

First aircraft to shoot down another aircraft: A French Voisin III, piloted by Sergeant Joseph Frantz, and Corporal Louis Quénault as passenger, engaged a German Aviatik B.II near Rheims on October 5, 1914. After expending his machine-gun ammunition, Quénault shot the German pilot (Wilhelm Schlichting) with his rifle, causing the Aviatik to crash.

First female military pilot: Eugenie Mikhailovna Shakhovskaya was a reconnaissance pilot in the Imperial Russian Air Service, having been ordered to active service on November 19, 1914.

First aircraft operated from a submarine: was a Friedrichshafen FF.29 floatplane flown by Friedrich von Arnauld de la Perière from the U-boat SM U-12 (Germany) on January 6, 1915, when the aircraft was unlashed from the U-boat, which submerged out from under it.

First aerial victory for a fighter aircraft armed with a fixed forward-firing machine gun: Roland Garros, while with Escadrille 23 of the Aéronautique Militaire worked with Raymond Saulnier on a synchronized machine gun, however when that failed, they attached steel wedges to the propeller blades, and he proceeded to down three German aircraft in March 1915 before his engine failed behind enemy lines.

First aerial victory for a fighter aircraft armed with a forward-firing synchronized machine gun: Leutnant Kurt Wintgens of Feldflieger Abteilung 6b of the German Army's Fliegertruppe air arm, flying a Fokker M.5K/MG Eindecker, downed a French Morane-Saulnier L near Lunéville, France, on July 1, 1915.Sands, Jeffrey, "The Forgotten Ace, Ltn. Kurt Wintgens and his War Letters", Cross & Cockade USA, Summer 1985.

First female combat fighter pilot: Marie Marvingt flew combat missions for France in 1915.Historic Wings – Online Magazine; Article on Hélène Dutrieu Coupe Femina and Marie Marvingt:, Published on December 21, 2012: http://fly.historicwings.com/2012/12/helene-dutrieux-and-the-coupe-femina Retrieved 10 January 2015.

First sinking of a ship with an aerial torpedo: Charles Edmonds in a Short 184 torpedoed and sank an abandoned Turkish supply ship in the Sea of Marmara on August 12, 1915.

First downing of a military aircraft with artillery fire: Serbian Army private Radoje Ljutovac hit an Austro-Hungarian aircraft on September 30, 1915 during a bombing raid on Kragujevac. 

First combat search and rescue by airplane: Richard Bell Davies landed his Nieuport 10 to rescue another pilot who had been shot down in Bulgaria on November 19, 1915.

First medical evacuation (medevac) by air: Louis Paulhan evacuated the seriously ill Milan Stefanik from the Serbian front in 1915.

First Black military pilot: Ahmet Ali Çelikten a.k.a. Arap Ahmet Ali was the first black military pilot, served in Ottoman Aviation Squadrons from 1914 or 1915.

First flight of a parasite or composite airplane: A Felixstowe Porte Baby carried aloft and then launched a Bristol Scout while in flight on May 17, 1916.

First air-to-air rocket attack to down an aircraft: Eight aces including Nungesser downed six observation balloons on May 22, 1916 while flying Nieuport 16s armed with Le Prieur rockets, blinding the German Army for a French counter-attack on Fort Douaumont.

First air-to-ground rocket attack: A roving Nieuport 16 equipped with Le Prieur rockets found a large ammunition dump, on June 29, 1916 and blew it up.

First submarine sunk by aircraft: HMS B10 was sunk by Lohner L aircraft of the Kaiserliche und Königliche Seeflugwesen (Austrian Naval Air Service) while tied up at Venice on August 9, 1916.

First submarine sunk while underway by aircraft: French submarine Foucault was bombed by two Austro-Hungarian Lohner L seaplanes while off Cattaro on September 15, 1916, which resulted in Foucault being forced to surface and her crew to abandon ship.

First authenticated membership in the "Mile-high club": by pilot/engineer Lawrence Sperry and socialite Dorothy Rice Sims in her Curtiss Model F flying boat, which was equipped with an autopilot near New York on November 21, 1916, however Sperry bumped the autopilot, and a botched landing resulted in both of them being discovered unclothed.

Practical flight 1917–1938

First unmanned (drone) aircraft to respond to control from the ground (RPV):The Aerial Target on 21 March 1917 

First flight by an all-metal aircraft with a stressed skin monocoque primary structure: by the Zeppelin-Lindau (Dornier) D.I cantilever biplane on June 4, 1918. It would also be the first such aircraft to enter production.

First transatlantic flight: Albert Cushing Read with a crew of five in a US Navy Curtiss NC flying boat, the NC-4, flew from New York City to Plymouth, England via Newfoundland, the Azores, and Portugal from May 8–31, 1919, stopping 23 times.

First non–stop transatlantic flight: John Alcock and Arthur Brown flew a Vickers Vimy from St. John's, Newfoundland, to Clifden, Ireland, on June 14–15, 1919.

First transatlantic stowaways: William Ballantyne and his tabby cat, Wopsie, aboard the R34 airship for a flight from the UK to Mineola, New York from July 2 to 6, 1919. Wopsy and two homing pigeons were the first animals to fly the Atlantic, with Wopsie being the first quadruped known to have flown across a major body of water.

First England to Australia flight: brothers Keith and Ross Macpherson Smith, with mechanics Sergeant Wallace H. Shiers and James M. Bennett, flew from Hounslow Heath Aerodrome to Darwin in a Vickers Vimy on December 10, 1919, winning a prize of £A10,000.

First Rome to Tokyo flight: Arturo Ferrarin (and engineer Gino Cappannini) in an Ansaldo SVA biplane in winning the Rome-Tokyo Raid on May 31, 1920

First flight across the Andes by a woman: Adrienne Bolland flew a Caudron G.3 from Mendoza, Argentina, to Santiago on April 1, 1921.

First flight by an aircraft with a pressurized cabin for high altitude flight: by a modified Engineering Division USD-9A A.S.40118 on June 8, 1921 by Art Smith.

First African–American or Native American or Black person to obtain an international pilot's license: Bessie Coleman on June 15, 1921 on a Nieuport 82.

First capital ship sunk by aircraft: Under orders from Brigadier General  William L. Mitchell, one Handley-Page O/400 and six Martin NBS-1 bombers led by Capt. Walter R. Lawson bombed the captured ex-German World War I battleship,  during a series of airpower tests, sinking it on July 21, 1921.

First crop duster: John Macready successfully flew a Curtiss Jenny that had been specially modified in a joint U.S. Department of Agriculture, and U.S. Army Signal Corps project from McCook Field in Dayton, Ohio to spray crops with lead arsenate to control a caterpillar infestation on August 3, 1921.  

First aerial refuelling: Done by Wesley “Wes” May, Frank Hawks and Earl Daugherty with a Lincoln Standard biplane and a Curtiss Jenny

First aerial crossing of the South Atlantic  (with aircraft replacement): Artur de Sacadura Cabral and Gago Coutinho flew from Lisbon, Portugal, to Rio de Janeiro, Brazil, in a total of three Fairey III.D floatplanes between March 30 and June 17, 1922. The first to use astronomical navigation (and to rely solely on it during the crossing), with an artificial horizon for aeronautical use.

First autogyro/autogiro flight: Alejandro Gomez Spencer made the first successful Autogyro flight in the Cierva C.4 on January 9, 1923 (O.C.), previous designs having failed to achieve flight.

First aerial refueling with a fuel line: A DH-4B biplane of the United States Army Air Service successfully refuelled another DH.4B, piloted by Lowell Smith, in mid-air on June 27, 1923.

First flight from Portugal to China: Using two different aircraft, Sarmento de Beires and Brito Pais flew  in 115 hours 45 minutes of flying time from Vila Nova de Milfontes, Alentejo to Shenzhen, near Hong Kong, between April 7 and June 20, 1924,

First aerial circumnavigation: Pilots Lowell H. Smith, Erik H. Nelson and John Harding Jr., in a pair of Douglas World Cruisers of the United States Army Air Service completed an aerial east–west circumnavigation of the world starting and ending in Seattle Washington, between April 6 and September 28, 1924.Unless specified, most circumnavigation flights were not done along the greatest distance, at the equator, but merely crossed all lines of longitude – often at high latitudes, and as far north as possible.

First Amsterdam to Tokyo flight: Pedro Leandro Zanni and mechanic Felipe Beltrame, flew , with a change of aircraft in Hanoi, from July 26 to October 11, 1924, with a flight time of 119 hours 50 minutes.
First nighttime aerial photograph by Lieutenant George W. Goddard of the United States Army Air Service on the night of November 20, 1925 using a flash bomb and aerial reconnaissance camera while flying over the Eastman Kodak building in Rochester, N Y.

First aerial crossing of the South Atlantic (single aircraft): Ramón Franco, Julio Ruiz de Alda Miqueleiz, Juan Manuel Duran and Pablo Rada, made between Spain and South America in the Plus Ultra, in January 1926.

First flight of a flying wing airplane: was made by the Chyeranovskii BICh-3 in 1926.

First successful flight of a glider tow plane: was made with a Raab-Katzenstein RK.6 Kranich flown by Kurt Katzenstein, towing a Raab-Katzenstein RK 7 Schmetterling glider flown by Antonius Raab on April 13, 1927.

First solo non-stop New York to Paris (city to city) transatlantic flight: Charles Lindbergh, flying the Spirit of St. Louis, made the 33-hour journey from New York to Paris on May 20–21, 1927, winning the Orteig Prize.

First outside loop: Jimmy Doolittle, in a Curtiss P-1B Hawk on May 25, 1927.

First flight from U.S. mainland to Hawaii: U.S. Army lieutenants Albert Francis Hegenberger and Lester J. Maitland flew from California to Hawaii in the Bird of Paradise, a C-2 transport, on June 28–29, 1927.

First female airline pilot: Marga von Etzdorf was hired by Lufthansa in 1927.

First east–west non–stop transatlantic crossing: the Bremen, a Junkers W 33 flown by Hermann Köhl with James Fitzmaurice as copilot, flew from Baldonnel, Ireland to Greenly Island in Quebec from April 12–13, 1928

First long distance mass formation flight: Italo Balbo led 60 Savoia-Marchetti S.55 flying boats from May 25 to June 2, 1928 from Tuscany over the Balearic Islands, along Spanish and French coasts, and finally returning to Italy.

First transpacific flight (US to Australia): Charles Kingsford Smith and crew, in the Southern Cross, flew from Oakland, California, to Brisbane, Australia via Hawaii and Fiji, between May 31 and June 9, 1928.

First rocket-powered aircraft to fly: was the Lippisch Ente flown by Fritz Stamer on June 11, 1928, using solid fuel rockets.

First woman to fly across the Atlantic (as passenger): Amelia Earhart was flown by Wilmer Stultz and Louis Gordon, in a Fokker F.VII, from Trepassey, Newfoundland, to Burry Port, Wales, on June 17, 1928.

First aircraft to fly powered with a diesel engine: was a Stinson SM-1DX Detroiter powered with a Packard DR-980 flown by Walter E. Lees on September 19, 1928.

First deployment of a whole-aircraft parachute recovery system: was made by Roscoe Turner flying a Thunderbird W-14 biplane on April 14, 1929.

First ship-launched flight to deliver transatlantic mail: Jobst von Studnitz flew a Heinkel HE 12 with 11,000 pieces of mail from the  while still at sea, to New York City several hours before the ship docked, on July 26, 1929.

First aircraft to be flown only on instruments (blind flying): was by Jimmy Doolittle in a Consolidated NY-2 on September 24, 1929.

First flight over the South Pole: in the "Floyd Bennett", a Ford 4-AT-B trimotor flown by Bernt Balchen with Harold June as co-pilot and Richard E. Byrd navigating, arriving shortly after midnight on November 29, 1929.

First aircraft to fly with a de-icing system: was a National Air Transport Boeing Model 40 modified by William C. Geer with an expanding rubber boot mounted on a strut, which was flown by Wesley L. Smith in late March 1930 for the first of three test flights than continued into April.

First trans-oceanic mass formation flight: Italo Balbo led twelve Savoia-Marchetti S.55 flying boats from Orbetello Airfield, Italy to Rio de Janeiro, Brazil between December 17, 1930 and January 15, 1931 which was documented in the first Italian aviation film Atlantic Flight (1931 film).

First flight by an aircraft with variable-sweep wings: was by the tailless Westland-Hill Pterodactyl IV with Flight-Lieutenant Louis G. Paget at the controls in April or May 1931. The wing sweep could be adjusted by 4.75 degrees in flight to provide trim adjustment.

First nonstop flight across the Pacific: Clyde Pangborn and Hugh Herndon flew 41 hours, 13 minutes in a heavily modified Bellanca CH-400 Skyrocket named Miss Veedol from Samushiro, Japan, to Wenatchee, Washington, on October 4–5, 1931.

First female pilot to fly solo across the Atlantic Ocean: Amelia Earhart, in a Lockheed Vega 5B, flew from Harbour Grace, Newfoundland, to Culmore, Ireland, on May 20, 1932.

"TsAGI 1-EA." ctrl-c.liu.se, March 24, 1997. Retrieved 12 December 2010.

First flight over Mount Everest: Lord Clydesdale in a Westland PV-3 and David McIntyre, in a Westland PV-6 flew over Everest on April 3, 1933 during their Houston–Mount Everest flight expedition.

First proven act of sabotage to a commercial aircraft in flight: The crash of a United Airlines Boeing 247 near Chesterton, Indiana, United States on October 10, 1933, killing all seven people aboard, was found to have been caused by a nitroglycerin-based bomb detonated during flight; eyewitnesses on the ground had seen the explosion. The perpetrator or perpetrators were never identified.

First scheduled commercial trans-Pacific passenger service: A Pan-American Martin M-130 began a proving flight on November 22, 1935 that led to passengers being carried on a regularly scheduled service from San Francisco to Manila that began on October 21, 1936.

First flight by a delta wing aircraft: was made by the Moskalyev SAM-9 Strela, flown by A.N.Rybko in early 1937.

First transatlantic commercial proving flights and quadruple crossing: An Imperial Airways Short Empire flying boat and a Pan-American Sikorsky S-42 flying boat both crossed the Atlantic on July 5, 1937, and then made the return flight. Both aircraft were operating at the extreme limits of their respective ranges, and so commercial service didn't start until a few years later.

First flight of a commercial aircraft with a pressurized cabin that would enter service:  was made on December 31, 1938 by the Boeing 307 Stratoliner.

Jet age, 1939–present

First flight by a liquid-fueled rocket-powered aircraft: was made by a Heinkel He 176 flown by Erich Warsitz on June 20, 1939.

First scheduled commercial transatlantic passenger service: Pan American Boeing 314 Clipper Yankee Clipper flying boats made the first scheduled commercial flight between New York City and Marseille, France on June 28, 1939.

First flight by a turbojet-powered aircraft: was made with a Heinkel He 178, flown by Erich Warsitz on August 27, 1939. 

 First Ramjet powered flight: was made by Petr Yermolayevich Loginov in a Polikarpov I-15bisDM modified with 2 DM-2 ramjets on January 25, 1940, with prior flights being made in December without the ramjets being powered.

First operational use of a military assault glider: was by the Luftwaffe, which used DFS 230 gliders to take the Fort Eben-Emael, and to capture critical bridges over the Albert Canal on May 10, 1940.

First flight of an aircraft powered by a motorjet/thermojet: was with a Caproni Campini N.1 flown by Mario de Bernardi on August 27, 1940

First flight with an afterburner: was made by a Caproni Campini C.C.2 motorjet on 11 April 1941.

First use of an Airborne Early Warning radar system: Vickers Wellington Mk.Ic R1629 was modified with a rotating radar array to increase detection range, and to direct fighters to intercept Focke-Wulf Fw 200 Condor bombers being used in the anti-shipping role, with the first operational trials occurring in April 1942. Advances in radar technology quickly made it obsolete, but similar conversions were also made in 1944 to Wellington Mk.XIV bombers to direct the interceptions of Heinkel He 111s that were launching V-1 flying bombs (cruise missiles) under the name "Air Controlled Interception". Beaufighters were directed toward the Heinkels while Mosquitos were directed to the V-1s, if a launch occurred. 

First purpose-built jet bomber to fly: was the Arado Ar 234 which made its first flight on July 30, 1943.

First rocket-powered aircraft used in combat: Major Späte of the EK 16 service test unit flew a Messerschmitt Me 163B Komet interceptor against Allied aircraft on May 13, 1944.

First jet fighter used in combat: A Messerschmitt Me 262 jet fighter flown by Leutnant Alfred Schreiber of Ekdo 262 service test unit attacked an RAF 540 Squadron de Havilland Mosquito, but failed to shoot it down on July 26, 1944.

 First jet on jet aerial victory: was scored by Flying Officer Dean of the Royal Air Force in a Gloster Meteor Mk.I EE216 against a V-1 flying bomb on August 4, 1944.

First fully automatic blind landing was made with Boeing 247D DZ203 by Flight Lieutenant Frank Griffiths of the Royal Air Force on 16 January 1945, while subsequent tests confirmed it in inclement weather. Previous landing systems required the pilot to see for the final approach.

First turboprop powered aircraft to fly: was a modified Gloster Meteor F.I powered by two Rolls-Royce Trent turbine engines driving propellers, on September 20, 1945.

First scheduled commercial transatlantic passenger service using landplanes: was made with an American Overseas Airlines Douglas DC-4 between New York City and Hurn Airport in England via Gander, Newfoundland, and Shannon, Ireland on October 23, 1945.

First known wheel-well stowaway: An Indonesian orphan, Bas Wie, 12, hid in the wheel well of a Dutch Douglas DC-3 flying from Kupang to Darwin, Australia, on August 7, 1946. He survived the three-hour flight despite severe injuries, and later became an Australian citizen.

First documented supersonic flight: was by Chuck Yeager in a Bell X-1 on October 14, 1947.

First flight by a jet transport: was by a Rolls-Royce Nene-powered Vickers VC.1 Viking on April 6, 1948.

First nonstop around-the-world flight: Starting on February 26, Capt. James Gallagher and his crew refuelled inflight four times in Boeing B-50A Superfortress Lucky Lady II while flying around the world, to return to where they started at Carswell AFB in Texas on March 2, 1949. 

First criminal prosecution of an aircraft bombing:  Albert Guay along with two accomplices was convicted of murder and hanged for the bombing of Canadian Pacific Air Lines Douglas DC-3 Flight 108 on September 9, 1949, which killed all 23 occupants.

First jet on manned jet aerial victory: was thought to have been by Lt. Brown in a F-80  over a MiG-15 on November 8, 1950, however that MiG survived. Instead the first victory was made in a Grumman F9F-2B Panther flown by Lt. Cdr. William T. Amen, commanding officer of VF-111, over Captain Mikhail Grachev in a MiG-15 from the 139th Guards Fighter Aviation Regiment on November 9, 1950.

First propeller driven aircraft to exceed the speed of sound (in a dive): was a McDonnell XF-88 Voodoo (without assistance from the jet engines) flown by Capt. Fitzpatrick in late June, 1953.

First aircraft to exceed Mach 2: Scott Crossfield was first to fly at twice the speed of sound in a Douglas D-558-2 Skyrocket on November 20, 1953.

First aircraft to fly with an area rule design: was the Grumman F9F-9 Tiger flown by Corwin Meyer on July 30, 1954.

First supercruise sustained supersonic flight in horizontal flight without using afterburner: was made by a Nord Gerfaut I research aircraft on August 3, 1954.

First aircraft shot down with a Surface-to-Air Missile (SAM): was a Taiwanese Martin RB-57D Canberra over China that was hit by three SA-2/V-750 missiles on October 7, 1959.

First manned Jetpack flights: Engineer Wendell Moore made the first flight at Bell Laboratories in February 1961.

 
First solo circumnavigation by a woman: Jerrie Mock returned to Columbus, Ohio, on May 17, 1964, having flown around the world in her Cessna 180 Skywagon since leaving the same airport 29 days earlier in a race with Joan Merriam Smith, who had followed a different route.

First pole-to-pole circumnavigation: was completed by Captains Fred Austin and Harrison Finch in Boeing 707-349C "Pole Cat", in 57 hours, 27 minutes on 15 November 1965.

First woman to fly for a major U.S. airline: Bonnie Tiburzi became the first female pilot for a major U.S. airline,  American Airlines, in March 1973.

First manned flight by an electrically powered aeroplane: was made with a Brditschka MB-E1, a modified motor glider with an  Bosch KM77 electric motor on October 23, 1973.

First scheduled supersonic passenger flights: were made with Concorde SSTs from London to Bahrain, and simultaneously from Paris to Rio de Janeiro on January 21, 1976.

First circumnavigation by helicopter: H. Ross Perot, Jr. and Jay Coburn in Bell 206L-1 LongRanger II Spirit of Texas, from September 1 to 30, 1982.

First non-stop, un-refueled flight around the Earth: was made by Dick Rutan and Jeana Yeager in the Rutan Voyager over 9 days, 3 minutes and 44 seconds, running from December 14 to 23, 1986. 

First all-female airliner crew: was the American Airlines Boeing 727 flown from Washington D.C. to Dallas, Texas captained by Beverley Bass  on December 30, 1986.

First helicopter to the North Pole: was a Bell Jetranger III flown by Dick Smith on April 28, 1987.

First flight by an aircraft fuelled only with hydrogen: was made by a Tupolev Tu-155 (a modified Tu-154 airliner) powered only by hydrogen on April 15, 1988. A NACA Martin B-57B flew on hydrogen in February 1957, but only for 20 minutes before reverting to jet fuel.

First circumnavigation which landed at both poles: was made in a de Havilland Canada DHC-6 Twin Otter flown by Dick Smith, who carried out landings on both poles during 1988 and 1989.

First east-west circumnavigation by helicopter: was completed in a  Sikorsky S-76 by Dick Smith in 1995.
 
First to land a helicopter at both Poles: Quentin Smith & Steve Brooks landed a Robinson R44 at the North Pole in October 2002 and at the South Pole in January 2005,

First solo non-stop fixed-wing aircraft flight around the Earth: was made in the Virgin Atlantic GlobalFlyer, flown by Steve Fossett, from Salina, Kansas, from February 28 to March 3, 2005, in 67 hours.

First solo flight by an armless pilot: Just using her legs Jessica Cox earned her pilot's license on May 10, 2008, flying a Ercoupe from  San Manuel Airport, Arizona.

First piloted overnight solar-powered flight in a fixed-wing aircraft: was made by André Borschberg on the Solar Impulse 1 between July 7–8, 2010.

First trans-Atlantic flight by autogyro: Norman Surplus flew solo from Belfast, Maine, to Larne, Northern Ireland in a Rotorsport UK MT-03 Autogyro "Roxy" between July 8, 2015 and August 11, 2015.

First piloted non-stop solar-powered transatlantic flight: Bertrand Piccard flew from New York City to Seville in the Solar Impulse 2 between June 20–23, 2016.

First circumnavigation of the world by a piloted fixed-wing aircraft using only solar power: Solar Impulse 2 between March 2015 and July 2016; Borschberg and Piccard alternated piloting stages of the journey.

First circumnavigation by helicopter passing antipodal points was completed with a Robinson R66 by Peter Wilson and Matthew Gallagher on August 7, 2017.

First electroaerodynamic thrust winged Ion-propelled aircraft test flight: MIT EAD Airframe Version 2 using ionic wind on November 21, 2018.

First circumnavigation by autogyro: Norman Surplus flew a RotorSport UK MT-03 between June 1, 2015 and June 28, 2019 from McMinnville, Oregon, USA, for an eastbound circumnavigation.

First female circumnavigation via both poles: were Payload Specialist Jannicke Mikkelsen, and Flight Attendant Magdelena Starowicz, as part of the crew of a Gulfstream G650ER One More Orbit between July 9, 2019 and July 11, 2019.

First powered, controlled takeoff and landing on another planet or celestial body: was the NASA rotorcraft Ingenuity on Mars on April 19, 2021.

See also
 Australian aviation firsts
 Circumnavigation
 List of circumnavigations
 Firsts in human spaceflight
 Timeline of women in aviation

 Notes 

 References 
 Citations 

 Sources 

 Conquistadors of the Sky: A History of Aviation in Latin America. Dan Hagedorn. University Press of Florida, 2008. .
 Interpretive History of Flight. M.J.B. Davy. Science Museum, London, 1937.
 Leave No Man Behind: The Saga of Combat Search and Rescue.'' George Galdorisi, Thomas Phillips. MBI Publishing Company, 2009. .
 

History of aviation
 
Aviation records
Aviation-related lists
Aviation